Stefano Zanini (born 23 January 1969 in Varese, Lombardy) is an Italian former professional road racing cyclist, the leadout man for Liquigas-Bianchi in 2006, after riding for Mapei, and Quick-Step.

His palmares include the Milano–Torino of 1995, Amstel Gold Race in 1996, one stage of the 2000 Tour de France and two stages at the Giro d'Italia (1994 and 2001).

He retired at the end of 2007 and took up the role of directeur sportif with the Silence-Lotto team. He is currently a directeur sportif with Astana Pro Team.

His name was on the list of doping tests published by the French Senate on 24 July 2013 that were collected during the 1998 Tour de France and found suspicious for EPO when retested in 2004.

Major results

1987
 1st  Overall Giro della Lunigiana
1989
 2nd Overall Giro Ciclistico d'Italia
1990
 5th Gran Premio della Liberazione
1992
 1st Coppa Sabatini
 1st Stage 5 Giro di Puglia
 1st Stage 7 Volta a Portugal
 2nd Giro dell'Etna
 5th Giro di Campania
1993
 5th Coppa Sabatini
 5th Trofeo Melinda
1994
 1st Giro dell'Etna
 1st Stage 22 Giro d'Italia
 2nd Nice–Alassio
 3rd Tre Valli Varesine
 4th Milan–San Remo
 6th Giro del Piemonte
 10th Overall Tirreno–Adriatico
1st Stage 5 
1995
 1st Milano–Torino
 1st Coppa Bernocchi
 1st Stage 7 Tirreno–Adriatico
 2nd Giro del Piemonte
 2nd Trofeo Laigueglia
 2nd Nice–Alassio
 2nd Japan Cup
 3rd Milan–San Remo
 5th Giro di Lombardia
 9th Rund um den Henninger-Turm
1996
 1st Amstel Gold Race
 1st Stage 3 Tour of the Basque Country
 1st Stage 5a Setmana Catalana de Ciclisme
 2nd Milano–Torino
 4th Paris–Roubaix
 5th Milan–San Remo
 5th Giro dell'Etna
 5th GP Industria & Artigianato di Larciano
 Giro d'Italia
Held  after Stage 3
Held  after Stages 2 & 3 
1997
 1st Gran Premio Bruno Beghelli
 Tour of the Basque Country
1st Stages 3 & 5a 
 2nd Coppa Bernocchi
 8th Milano–Torino
1998
 1st Paris–Brussels
 1st Gran Premio Bruno Beghelli
 1st Stage 3a Three Days of De Panne
 2nd Tour of Flanders
 4th Milan–San Remo
 4th Paris–Tours
 8th Breitling Grand Prix (with Daniele Nardello)
 10th Coppa Bernocchi
1999
 1st Stage 5a Volta a la Comunitat Valenciana
2000
 1st Stage 21 Tour de France
 1st Stage 10 Tour de Suisse
 1st Stage 3 Tour of the Basque Country
 5th Paris–Roubaix
 10th Kuurne–Brussels–Kuurne
2001
 1st Stage 7 Giro d'Italia
 1st Stage 2 Tour of the Basque Country
 1st Stage 2 Giro Riviera Ligure Ponente
 1st Stage 1 Tour of Slovenia
 5th Gran Premio Bruno Beghelli
 8th Giro della Provincia di Siracusa
2002
 2nd Overall Three Days of De Panne
1st  Points classification
1st Stage 1
2003
 1st US Pro Championship
 5th Firenze–Pistoia
 7th Paris–Tours
 8th Giro del Piemonte
 9th HEW Cyclassics
2004
 1st Stage 1 Tour of Britain
 5th Coppa Bernocchi
2005
 1st  Intergiro classification Giro d'Italia

Grand Tour general classification results timeline

References

External links 

Official Tour de France results for Stefano Zanini

Italian male cyclists
Italian Tour de France stage winners
Cyclists from Varese
Tour de France Champs Elysées stage winners
Italian Giro d'Italia stage winners
1969 births
Living people
Tour de Suisse stage winners